The 1902 Campeonato Paulista, organized by the LPF (Liga Paulista de Football), was the 1st season of São Paulo's top association football league. São Paulo Athletic won the title for the 1st time. no teams were relegated and the top scorer was São Paulo Athletic's Charles Miller with 10 goals.

System
The championship was disputed in a double-round robin system, with the team with the most points winning the title.

Championship

Finals

References

Campeonato Paulista seasons
Paulista
1902 in South American football leagues